The Art Academy of Latvia is an institution of higher education and scientific research in art, located in Riga, Latvia. The neo-Gothic brick building is located on Krišjānis Valdemārs Street, next to the National Museum of Art.

Organization

Faculties
The Academy has 5 faculties:
 Faculty of Visual Arts (2D)
 Department of Painting
 Department of Graphic Art
 Department of Textile Art
 Department of Drawing
 Faculty of Visual Plastic Arts (3D)
 Department of Sculpture
 Department of Ceramics
 Department of Glass Art
 Faculty of Design
 Department of Functional Design
 Department of Environmental Art
 Department of Metal Design
 Department of Fashion Design
 Faculty of Audio-Visual Media Art
 Department of Visual Communication
 Department "Motion. Image. Sound"
 Department of Stage Design
 Faculty of Art History
 Department of Art History and Theory
 Department of Restoration
 Department of Humanities

Latgale Branch
The Academy has a branch in Latgale located in Rēzekne.

Notable alumni
 Arturs Akopjans - figurative and abstract artist
 Lidija Auza - assemblage and abstract artist
 Biruta Baumane - 2002 winner of the Baltic Assembly Prize for Literature, the Arts and Science
 Anšlavs Eglītis - novelist and author of short stories
 Sandra Kalniete - Minister of Foreign Affairs, European Commissioner and Member of the European Parliament
 Gunārs Lūsis - graphic designer responsible with Jānis Strupulis for the design of coinage of the post-Soviet edition of the lat
 Kārlis Padegs - expressionist painter
 Ināra Tetereva - philanthropist behind the Boris and Ināra Teterev fund, a Latvian patron of the arts
 Ēvī Upeniece - sculptor

Gallery

External links

References

Art schools in Latvia
Education in Riga
Art Academy of Latvia
1921 establishments in Latvia
Arts organizations established in 1921
Educational institutions established in 1921